The Lotte Giants are a South Korean professional baseball team based in Busan. They are a member of the KBO League. The Lotte Giants are owned by Lotte Corporation, which also owns the Chiba Lotte Marines of Nippon Professional Baseball.

From 1982 through 1986, they played at Gudeok Baseball Stadium and since then have played at Sajik Baseball Stadium. They have won the Korean Series twice, in 1984 and 1992. The team drew about 1.38 million spectators during the 2009 season, a record which remains as the highest attendance in a single season in any South Korean sports league. They are often called the Busan Seagulls because the official bird of the city of Busan is the seagull, and their main fight song is Moon Seung-jae's "Busan Seagulls".

History

Origins 
The Lotte Giants were founded as an amateur baseball team of the Korea Baseball Association in Seoul, South Korea, on 6 May 1975. On 22 February 1982, the Giants became professional and moved to Busan, the second-largest city in South Korea.

1980s 
The Lotte Giants made their KBO League debut against the Haitai Tigers at Gudeok Baseball Stadium on 28 March 1982. They defeated the Tigers 14–2, but finished the year in fifth place out of six teams with a .388 winning percentage. Choi Dong-won, Ryu Du-yeol, and Sim Jae-won of the Korea national baseball team postponed joining the Giants to play for the country in the 1982 Amateur World Series, held in Seoul.

In 1984, the Giants won their first Korean Series title in the third season after the KBO League was launched. They beat the Samsung Lions 4–3 in the Korean Series. They were led by Choi Dong-won, one of the most dominant pitchers in the Korea Professional Baseball league, who finished the 1984 season with 27 wins, 223 strikeouts, and a 2.40 ERA and won the regular season MVP Award. In the 1984 Korean Series, he appeared in five out of seven games, had a 4–1 record (one shutout, three complete games, and one five-inning relief appearance), and pitched 40 innings in ten days.

The Giants made one of the biggest trades in KBO League history after the 1988 season when they sent their star pitcher Choi Dong-won and Kim Yong-chul to the Samsung Lions, and received hitter Jang Hyo-jo and pitcher Kim Si-kin.

1990s 
The Giants made it back to the Korean Series in 1995 and 1999, losing both times. They have not appeared in the Korean Series since 1999.

2000s 
From 2001 to 2007 the Giants did not qualify for the postseason, finishing in last place for four consecutive years (2001–2004). In mid-2001, the Giants' manager Kim Myung-seong, who had been in charge of the team since 1998, died of a heart attack. He was replaced by Woo Yong-deuk.

Late in 2007, the Giants signed American Jerry Royster to become the manager of the Giants, making him the first-ever non-Korean to take the helm of one of South Korea's professional baseball clubs. Royster served as the Giants' manager through the 2010 season, guiding the team to the playoffs in all three seasons.

Popularity and attendance 
  
The Giants are the most popular team in the Korea Baseball Organization league. According to a Gallup Korea's survey conducted in 2011, the Giants were chosen as the most popular team three times in a row. They attracted over 1 million fans to Sajik Baseball Stadium in 1991 for the first time in league history. In the 2009 season, they set the all-time record of home attendance of 1,380,018 fans. In the 2011 season, they also led the league in the total home attendance with 1,358,322 fans at 67 home games. The average attendance was 20,273 fans per game, meaning the stadium was 71% full on average per game. From 2008 to 2011, they drew over 1 million fans for four consecutive years.

Season-by-season records

Team

Current roster

Retired numbers 
The club's first retired number is Choi Dong-won's squad number 11. Described as one of the top pitchers in the Korea Professional Baseball league, he played for the Giants between 1983 and 1988, and won the KBO MVP award in 1984. Choi died of cancer in 2011.

Managers 
Park Young-gil (1982–1983)
Kang Byeong-chel (1983–1986)
Seong Gi-young (1987)
Eu Woo-hong (1987–1989)
Kim Jin-young (1989–1990)
Shosuke Doi (1990) (caretaker)
Kang Byeong-chel (1990–1993)
Kim Yong-hee (1993–1998)
Kim Myung-seong (1998–2001)
Woo Yong-deuk (2001–2002)
Kim Yong-hee (2002) (caretaker)
Baek In-cheon (2002–2003)
Kim Yong-cheol (2003) (caretaker)
Yang Sang-moon (2003–2005)
Kang Byeong-chel (2005–2007)
Jerry Royster (2008–2010)
Yang Seung-ho (2011–2012)
Kwon Doo-jo (2012) (caretaker)
Kim Si-jin (2012–2014)
Lee Jong-un (2014–2015)
Cho Won-woo (2015–2018)
Yang Sang-moon (2019)
Kong Pil-seong (2019) (caretaker)
Heo Moon-hoi (2020–2021)
Larry Sutton (2021–present)

References 
General

Specific

External links

 
  

 
KBO League teams
Sport in Busan
Baseball teams established in 1975
Lotte Corporation
1975 establishments in South Korea